NHL '94 is an ice hockey game by EA Sports for the Genesis, Super NES, and Sega CD, as well as the first release for the PC (DOS), simply titled "NHL Hockey", without the "94" in the title. The game is officially licensed from the National Hockey League and the NHL Players' Association, and was the first game in the series to have both combined licenses. Being the third game in the NHL series media franchise, it was released in October 1993. NHL '94 launched to critical acclaim, and it has since been referred to as both the greatest sports game of all time as well as one of the best games ever made.

Gameplay

The game maintained the series' signature vertical camera angle, which offered the player distinct gameplay and strategic advantages over contemporary side-view hockey games, and kept the 2D sprite character models of NHLPA '93 (albeit with some new animations). The team rosters and player attributes in the game reflect that of the 1993-94 season, and include the league's two new expansion teams for that season, the Mighty Ducks of Anaheim (now the Anaheim Ducks) and Florida Panthers.

Many improvements were made to the engine by EA between 1992 and 1993. Notably, NHL '94 introduced the "one timer", an authentic hockey move where a player shoots the puck directly off of a pass.  NHL 94 also added the ability to save records, and has four modes: Exhibition Game, Playoffs, Best of Seven Playoffs, and Shootout. There are no international teams, but both all-star teams are present. Also introduced were team-specific organ songs played at the start of periods and after goals—examples included the Hartford Whalers' trademark "Brass Bonanza", "Halte-là! Les Canadiens sont là!" for the Montreal Canadiens, "When the Saints Go Marching In" for the St. Louis Blues, "The Sabre Dance" for the Buffalo Sabres, and the Chicago Blackhawks theme song "Here Come the Hawks". "Birthday" by The Beatles is also featured as an organ song after a goal is scored.

Game modes
Exhibition Game
Stanley Cup Playoffs: Single Game Series
Stanley Cup Playoffs: Best of Seven Series
Shootout Mini-Game

Other versions
A version titled  was released in Japan for the Super Famicom which has all the important text in Japanese including the main menu, the actual hockey players, the secondary (end of period and post-game) menus, and the crowd meter. However, the passwords still use ASCII letters and numbers exclusively.

The National Hockey League had EA Sports remove fighting from the Sega CD version of the game.

The NHL 94 game engine was later used (albeit modified for extra violence) for EA's Sega Genesis game Mutant League Hockey.

The game was included in the PlayStation 2 version of NHL 06. The port included was based on the Sega Genesis version, but lacks the official NHL rosters from the original title. Furthermore, the Hartford Whalers were known as the Hartford Canes in that version, as a nod to the team's current name, the Carolina Hurricanes.

On July 11, 2013, it was announced that NHL 14 would include a NHL '94 Anniversary Mode, celebrating the 20th anniversary of NHL '94. It changes NHL 14 audiovisually and control-wise to resemble NHL '94, using the teams and players from the 2013-2014 NHL season, alongside the music from the Sega Genesis version. It also changes other gameplay elements like including faster game speed and having relaxed game rules. It would later return in the Xbox 360 and PS3 versions of NHL 15, using the teams and players from the 2014-15 NHL season, and NHL: Legacy Edition, using the teams and players from the 2015-16 NHL season.

On October 2, 2020, it was announced that a Remake of NHL ‘94 tilted NHL ‘94 Rewind, developed by Empty Clip Studios for the PlayStation 4 and Xbox One, using the Arsenal emulation software engine, would be released on October 30 for players who pre-ordered NHL 21. In December 2020, it became available for purchase to anyone who owns NHL 21. This version is based on the Sega Genesis version and features the teams and players from the 2020-21 NHL season.

Reception

Computer Gaming World in 1993 stated that NHL Hockey for DOS had "a playing environment that is flush with realism, excitement and credibility". The magazine concluded that "players will lose themselves in the simulation and feel they are in control of a televised NHL broadcast ... an experience well worth the price of admission". In June 1994 it was a finalist for the magazine's Sports Game of the Year award, losing to Front Page Sports Football Pro.

GamePro gave the Sega CD version a perfect score, citing improved controls and playability from the already outstanding Genesis and SNES versions, as well as the use of real life NHL footage.

Allgame editor Scott Alan Marriot described NHL '94 as "the best playing hockey game at the time of its release".

Accolades

IGN ranked the game 59th on their "Top 100 SNES Games of All Time."  They opined that NHL 94  "Truly defined hockey adaptations in the 16-bit era."  They also praised the four player function and described the single player gameplay as "Fast and frantic pace of skating and slap-shotting here felt utterly unrivaled."  The only criticism they had was that NHL 94 removed the option to brawl with the opposing team. In 1994, PC Gamer US named NHL Hockey the 11th best computer game ever. The editors called it "nearly flawless in its representation of the speed and the strategies of full-tilt, real-time NHL hockey — and besides, it's one of the best PC games available." That same year, PC Gamer UK named it the 41st best computer game of all time, calling it "one of the most enjoyable PC sports sims to date". In 1996, GamesMaster ranked the Mega Drive version 65th in its "Top 100 Games of All Time."

Legacy
In the years following its release, NHL '94 has come to be considered one of the greatest sports games of all time. The Genesis version was included as #61 on Electronic Gaming Monthlys "100 Best Games of All Time" in 1997 and as #47 on IGN's Top 100 Games of All-Time in 2005. It was named All-Time Greatest Sports Video Game by Boston.com. It was also ranked second by ESPN on its all-time sports video games rankings. Bleacher Report listed it as the second best hockey video game ever made (behind NHL 10 but also cited it as "one of the best video games ever made.")

Former NHL player Jeremy Roenick credits his fame to the exposure he received from NHL '94, as he was listed as one of the best players in the game.

In 2012, GamesRadar ranked it as the 25th best Sega Genesis game due in part to its realism. In 2014, GamesRadar updated the list and NHL '94 was ranked 15th.

The goal horn sound from the Sega Genesis version was used in the World of CHEL mode since NHL 19 as an unlockable goal horn.

Notes

References

External links
 
 
 Game manual
 NHL94.com
 NHL '94 (Super NES) at GameFAQs
 NHL '94 (Mega Drive/Genesis) at GameFAQs
 NHL '94 (Sega CD) at GameFAQs

1993 video games
Electronic Arts games
DOS games
Super Nintendo Entertainment System games
Sega Genesis games
Sega CD games
NHL (video game series)
EA Sports games
Victor Entertainment games
Video games set in 1993
Video games set in 1994
Multiplayer and single-player video games
Video games set in Canada
Video games set in the United States
Video games developed in Canada
High Score Productions games